MCHS may refer to:

Schools

In Canada
 Morinville Community High School in Morinville, Alberta
 Marystown Central High School in Marystown, Newfoundland and Labrador
 Memorial Composite High School in Stony Plain, Alberta

In the United Kingdom
 Mcauley Catholic High School in Doncaster, South Yorkshire, United Kingdom
 Mearns Castle High School in Newton Mearns, Scotland
 Monkseaton Community High School in Whitley Bay, England
 Meols Cop High School In Southport, England

In the United States

In Wisconsin
Milwaukee County Historical Society in Milwaukee Wisconsin

In California
 Maria Carrillo High School in Santa Rosa, California
 Marin Catholic High School in Marin County, California
 Milken Community High School in Bel Air, Los Angeles, California
 Mira Costa High School in Manhattan Beach, California
 Moreau Catholic High School in Hayward, California
 Mount Carmel High School in San Diego, California

In Kentucky
 Madison Central High School (Kentucky) in Richmomd, Kentucky

In Illinois
 McHenry West High School in Mchenry, Illinois
McHenry East High School in Mchenry, Illinois
Mascoutah Community High School in Mascoutah, Illinois
 Minooka Community High School in Minooka, Illinois
 Morris Community High School in Morris, Illinois
 Montini Catholic High School in Lombard, Illinois

In Mississippi
 Madison Central High School (Mississippi) in Madison, Mississippi

In New York
 Massena Central High School in Massena, New York
 Moore Catholic High School in Staten Island, New York

In North Carolina
 Mallard Creek High School in Charlotte, North Carolina
 Middle Creek High School in Apex, North Carolina

In Tennessee
 McMinn County High School in Athens, Tennessee
 McMinn Central High School in Etowah, Tennessee
 Memphis Catholic High School in Memphis, Tennessee

In Texas
 Mayde Creek High School in Houston, Texas
 McCollum High School in San Antonio, Texas

Other schools in the United States
 Malden Catholic High School in Malden, Massachusetts
 Manheim Central High School in Manheim, Pennsylvania
 Martin County High School in Stuart, Florida
 Michigan City High School in Michigan City, Indiana
 Midwest City High School in Midwest City, Oklahoma
 Mill Creek High School in Hoschton, Georgia
 Monroe Catholic High School in Fairbanks, Alaska
 Morgan City High School in Morgan City, Louisiana
 Madison County High School in Madison, Virginia

In Japan 
 Matsuyama Central Senior High School in Matsuyama, Ehime

Other schools
 Middle College High School (disambiguation), the name of multiple schools
 Marian Catholic High School (disambiguation), the name of multiple schools
 Marquette Catholic High School (disambiguation), the name of multiple schools
Magdalene Catholic high school in Smeaton Grange NSW Australia

Other uses
 Marine Corps Common Hardware Suite
 Ministry of Emergency Situations, Russia
 Manitowoc County Historical Society in Manitowoc, Wisconsin, United States
 Mayo Clinic Health System